Top Model (formerly Top Model. Zostań modelką (English: Top Model. Become a Model)) is a Polish reality television series based on Tyra Banks' "America's Next Top Model", which sees a number of aspiring models compete against each other in a variety of competitions to win the title of Top Model among other prizes in hopes of a successful career in the modeling business.

The competition is hosted by Polish American model Joanna Krupa, who serves as the lead judge. The other members of the judging panel are fashion designer Dawid Woliński, runway coach Kasia Sokołowska and photographer Marcin Tyszka. Model Anja Rubik has made several guest appearances throughout the show's run.

Judges

Format

Challenges
Challenges generally focus on elements important to modeling which will help the contestants improve for the week's photo shoot. A guest judge evaluates the contestants and decides the winner of each challenge. The winner of the challenge receives a prize for their victory, such as immunity from elimination for the week. Sometimes the challenge winner is permitted to choose a certain number of other contestants to share their reward, while the others receive no prize.

Judging and elimination
Once a week, based on the models' performance in the week's challenge, photo shoot, and general attitude, the judges are required to eliminate one contestant from the competition. During the elimination ceremony, the host calls out the names of the contestants who are still in the competition, handing them a copy of their best photo from the shoot. The two or three worst-performing models of the week are in danger of elimination, and one of them is eliminated. In some cases, the series sees double eliminations and non-eliminations by consensus of the judging panel.

Differences from America's Next Top Model
In contrast to America's Next Top Model, in which each cycle begins with preliminary rounds that span one or two episodes and around 30 pre-selected semi-finalists, Top Model begins with several rounds of open auditions held in cities across Poland, followed by a "bootcamp" which concludes with the selection of the final cast of 13 to 16, with the casting process spanning three or four episodes. Contestants are sometimes split into pairs for photo shoots, and the better-performing contestant from each pair is determined during the evaluation panel and granted immunity. Each cycle concludes with a live broadcast in which the final three or four contestants compete in front of a live audience, and a televote decides the winner of the competition.

Cycles

References

 

 
2010 Polish television series debuts
TVN (Polish TV channel) original programming
Polish television series based on American television series